Michel Ferracci-Porri (born 24 September 1949) is a French writer.

Bibliography 
La Môme Moineau (Normant Ed. France 2006)
Beaux Ténèbres, la pulsion du mal d'Eugène Weidman (Normant Ed. France 2008)
The Affair of the Phantom of Heilbronn/ L'Affaire du Fantôme de Heilbronn Ed. Normant. France 2009)
Joyeuse Encyclopédie Anecdotique de la Gastronomie with Maryline Paoli. Preface by Christian Millau (Normant Ed. France 2012)
L'Affaire Brian Blackwell ou La Rage de Narcisse/The Brian Blackwell Case or The Rage of Narcissus.(Normant Ed. France, April 2015)

References

External links 
 La Môme Moineau sur voila.fr
 Editions Normant

1949 births
Living people
Writers from Ajaccio
French male non-fiction writers
21st-century French male writers
21st-century French non-fiction writers